John Smith (December 21, 1752 – April 30, 1809) was a professor at Dartmouth College and the author of the first unpointed Hebrew grammar book published in the United States.

Smith was born in Byfield, Massachusetts. After graduating from Dartmouth, he moved to West Hartford, Connecticut, and became a pastor. In 1777, he returned to Dartmouth as a professor in of English, Greek, Latin, Hebrew and Aramaic.

Smith arrived in Hanover in 1771 after graduating from Byefield Academy where he had studied under the classical scholar Samuel Moody. He was admitted to the junior class and graduated in 1773.  He then studied divinity under Dartmouth President Eleazar Wheelock while serving as tutor in ancient languages for the freshman and sophomore classes.  In 1776 he was granted the degree of Master of Arts. He was then appointed Dartmouth's first professor in November 1777.  The agreement between Eleazar Wheelock and John Smith was written in November 1777 and amended by Dartmouth's Trustees in August 1778.

From his early interest in Greek and Latin, he soon proceeded to master Hebrew, Chaldaic, Arabic and other oriental languages. In 1780 he also prepared an interesting set of lectures on Natural Philosophy covering Newtonian astronomy and earth science, in which he speculated on the possibility of multiple peopled worlds and the origin of the Indians.  These lectures seem to have stimulated his students Solomon Spaulding and Ethan Smith to further speculate on the later subject.

In 1779 Smith also was appointed college librarian.  After the death of Professor of Divinity Sylvanus Ripley in 1787, he absorbed Ripley's duties.  In 1788 Smith was also appointed to the Board of Trustees.  He also was pastor of the College Church and led the daily chapel sessions.

In the late 1790s and early 19th century he prepared a remarkable set of theological lectures that covered various aspects of the details of his Armininan (free will), non Calvinist thinking.  All of his published grammars and unpublished lectures and grammars can be found in the Rauner Special collections library at Dartmouth.

His theological work was so appreciated by the Freewill Baptists at Brown that he was granted a Doctor of Divinity degree in 1803. He was in the final stages of preparing his theology lectures for publication in 1809 when he died.  His work generally anticipated the efforts of Joseph Smith's development of Mormon doctrine.

Smith died from tuberculosis in 1809.

References

 Goldman, Yosef. Hebrew Printing in America, 1735-1926, A History and Annotated Bibliography (YGBooks 2006). .
 Husband, Richard Wellington, 'The First Professor in Dartmouth College', Dartmouth Alumni Magazine
 Chapman, George T, Sketches of the Alumni of Dartmouth College, (Cambridge: Riverside Press, 1867)
 Behrens, Richard K, 'Dartmouth Arminianism and Its Impact on Hyrum Smith and the Smith Family', John Whitmer Historical Association Journal (2006)
 "An Agreement between the Reverend Eleazar Wheelock, President of Dartmouth College and Mr. John Smith, later Tutor of the same with respect to said Mr. Smith¹s settlement + salary, in capacity of Professor of the languages in Dartmouth College" ("Copy from the Original" dated November 9, 1777 and August 27, 1778) Ravi D. Goel Collection on Yale (RU 1081). Manuscripts and Archives, Yale University Library

External links
 

1752 births
1809 deaths
19th-century deaths from tuberculosis
American lexicographers
American librarians
Arminian ministers
Arminian writers
Dartmouth College alumni
Dartmouth College faculty
Tuberculosis deaths in New Hampshire
18th-century lexicographers